Agmondisham Cuffe  was an Irish politician.

Cuffe was educated at Trinity College Dublin.

Cuffe represented Kilkenny County from 1698 to 1699. He died in December 1717.

References

Irish MPs 1695–1699
Members of the Parliament of Ireland (pre-1801) for County Kilkenny constituencies
1727 deaths
Alumni of Trinity College Dublin